Will Jacobsen is an American former basketball player who at  was among the tallest players in the history of NCAA Division I men's basketball while playing center for the Gonzaga Bulldogs and later professionally for several NBA D and G League teams.

Jacobsen was born on March 7, 1988, in Bonney Lake, Washington, as Will Foster and grew up in Enumclaw, Washington, before moving to Buckley, Washington. He graduated from White River High School in 2006 where he started slow on the basketball team but became a notable player by his senior year, and top college teams tried to recruit him. Jacobsen attended Gonzaga University in Spokane, Washington, where he played for the Bulldogs while earning a bachelor of arts degree in sports management from 2006 to 2010. He played professionally for five NBA minor league teams as well as in Portugal, the Dominican Republic, and Japan.

Jacobsen has a  arm span.

See also 
 List of tallest people

References

External links 
 RealGM profile
 ProBallers profile

Gonzaga Bulldogs men's basketball players
Centers (basketball)
1988 births
Living people
Undrafted National Basketball Association players
Gonzaga University alumni
Northwest University (United States) alumni